Trecate railway station is a railway station in Italy. Located on the Turin–Milan railway, it serves the municipality of Trecate in Piedmont, even if it is part of the Lombardy railway system. The train services are operated by Trenord.

Train services 
The station is served by the following service(s):

Milan Metropolitan services (S6) Novara - Rho - Milan - Treviglio

Reflist

See also 
 Milan suburban railway network

Railway stations in Piedmont
Milan S Lines stations
Railway stations opened in 1854
1854 establishments in the Austrian Empire